Hacıkırı railway station is a railway station in the village of Kiralan, Adana in Turkey. South of the station lies the well-known Varda Viaduct.

Hacıkırı station was originally constructed in 1912 by the Baghdad Railway and remained the northern terminus of the southern half of the railway (the northern half being across the Çakıt Valley). The station played an important role during World War I, where troops and material coming from the north would board trains at Hacıkırı, after traversing a  gap in the railway. The tunnels between Hacıkırı and Belemedik were finally completed in September 1918 and the station officially opened on 9 October, 11 days before the Ottoman Empire capitulated.

Hacıkırı station consists of an island platform serving two tracks, with three more tracks used as sidings.

TCDD Taşımacılık operates two daily intercity trains from Konya and Kayseri to Adana.

References

External links
TCDD Taşımacılık
Passenger trains
Hacıkırı station timetable

Railway stations in Adana Province
Railway stations opened in 1918
1918 establishments in the Ottoman Empire